Sharpless is a surname. Notable people with the surname include:

Bevan Sharpless, solar system astronomer
Karl Barry Sharpless, American chemist and Nobel prize winner
Josh Sharpless, baseball player
Christopher Sharpless, 1988 Winter Olympics bobsledder 
Mattie R. Sharpless (born 1942), American diplomat
Stewart Sharpless, galactic astronomer
Sharpless catalog, a 20th-century astronomical catalog with 313 items
Isaac Sharpless, educator
Norman Sharpless, American oncologist and director of the National Cancer Institute
Disappearance of Toni Sharpless, an American nurse who disappeared in 2009

Fictional characters
A character in Madama Butterfly

See also
Sharpless asymmetric dihydroxylation, a chemical reaction
Sharpless epoxidation, a chemical reaction
Sharpless oxyamination, a chemical reaction